Ombos may refer to any of several ancient cities in Egypt, including:

Ombos, capital of its own nome, now Kom Ombo, Egypt
Ombos, now Naqada, Egypt